Sand Creek Township may refer to:

Indiana
 Sand Creek Township, Bartholomew County, Indiana
 Sand Creek Township, Decatur County, Indiana
 Sand Creek Township, Jennings County, Indiana

Iowa
 Sand Creek Township, Union County, Iowa, in Union County, Iowa

Kansas
 Sand Creek Township, Meade County, Kansas, in Meade County, Kansas

Minnesota
 Sand Creek Township, Minnesota

Nebraska
 Sand Creek Township, Holt County, Nebraska

South Dakota
 Sand Creek Township, Beadle County, South Dakota, in Beadle County, South Dakota

Township name disambiguation pages